The Standard Insurance Center, originally the Georgia-Pacific Building, is a 27-story office building in Portland, Oregon. Completed in 1970, it currently serves as part of the headquarters of The Standard, the brand name under which Standard Insurance Company and other subsidiaries of StanCorp Financial Group, Inc., do business. Standard also owns the 16-story Standard Plaza, located two blocks south along 5th Avenue.

History
The Georgia-Pacific Building was commissioned by Georgia-Pacific and designed by the firm of Skidmore, Owings & Merrill (SOM). At the time of construction, it was the tallest reinforced concrete building in the world. It was completed in 1970.

When Georgia-Pacific left Portland, the Standard Insurance Company purchased the building in 1984 for $43 million, renamed it Standard Insurance Center, and removed all GP signage.

Details
Valued at $114 million, the structure contains  of space. Built of concrete and steel, the tower is considered Modernist in style. One major tenant was the Stoel Rives law firm, which leased the top nine stories at the building until 2016. The Quest, an elaborate sculpture considered Portland’s largest single piece of white sculpted marble, is in front of the building. An untitled chrome sculpture is tucked away in the building's basement.

See also
Architecture of Portland, Oregon
List of tallest buildings in Portland, Oregon
 The Quest (Portland, Oregon) (1970)

References

External links 

1970 establishments in Oregon
Skidmore, Owings & Merrill buildings
Skyscraper office buildings in Portland, Oregon
Georgia-Pacific
Meiji Yasuda Life
Office buildings completed in 1970
Southwest Portland, Oregon
Modernist architecture in Oregon